The Good Stuff is an album by American singer/songwriter Peter Mulvey, released in 2012.

Reception

Martin Chilton of The Telegraph wrote of the album "That it all came together wonderfully is a testament to Mulvey, his band's musicianship and the choice of original, interesting and varied songs.". Kiel Hauck of PopMatters wrote "While a few of the tracks on The Good Stuff feel a bit tired and re-hashed, the album as a whole is quite pleasing and captures the essence of folk music in true form."

Track listing
 "Sad And Blue" (Melvern Taylor) – 4:08
"Everybody Knows" (Leonard Cohen) – 4:28
"Are You Sure?" (Willie Nelson, Buddy Emmons) – 2:59
"(I Don't Know Why) But I Do" (Bobby Charles, Clarence "Frogman" Henry) – 3:53
"Time To Spend" (Chris Smither) – 3:07
"Egg Radio" (Bill Frisell) – 3:39
"Green Grass" (Tom Waits, Kathleen Brennan) – 3:28
"Mood Indigo" ( Duke Ellington, Barney Bigard, Irving Mills) – 3:27
"Old Fashioned Morphine" (Jolie Holland) – 3:55
"High Noon" (David Goodrich) – 3:04
"No Sugar" (Tim Gearan) – 2:47
"Sugar" (Anita Suhanin) – 2:58
"Richard Pryor Addresses A Tearful Nation" (Joseph Lee Henry) – 5:13
"Ruby, My Dear" (Thelonious Monk) – 2:12

Personnel
Peter Mulvey - vocals, acoustic guitar, banjo
Kris Delmhorst – vocals
David Goodrich – guitar, vocals
Randy Sabien – organ, piano, violin
Paul Kochanski – upright bass
Jason Smith – drums
Barry Rothman – turntables

Production notes
 Peter Mulvey – producer
 David Goodrich – producer
 Mark Thayer – engineer, mixing
 Ian Kennedy – mastering
 Allie Justice – design
 Jim Dingilian – cover photo

References

2012 albums
Peter Mulvey albums